Ben Burr-Kirven (born September 8, 1997) is an American football linebacker who is a free agent. He played college football at Washington.

Early years
Burr-Kirven attended Sacred Heart Preparatory School in Atherton, California. He was the San Jose Mercury News Player of the Year as a junior and senior. He committed to the University of Washington to play college football.

College career
Burr-Kirven played at Washington from 2015 to 2018. He became a starter during his junior season in 2017. As a senior in 2018, he was the Pac-12 Defensive Player of the Year and a member of the AP All-America team. He majored in film studies at Washington, and received honors from the department.

Professional career

Burr-Kirven was drafted by the Seattle Seahawks in the fifth round (142nd overall) of the 2019 NFL Draft.

Burr-Kirven was placed on injured reserve on August 23, 2021, after suffering a torn ACL in the preseason. He was waived on July 26, 2022 and placed on the reserve/PUP list.

On March 10, 2023, Burr-Kirven was released by the Seahawks.

References

External links
Washington Huskies bio

1997 births
Living people
People from Menlo Park, California
Players of American football from California
American football linebackers
Sportspeople from the San Francisco Bay Area
Washington Huskies football players
Seattle Seahawks players